

Nikolaus von Vormann (24 December 1895  – 26 October 1959) was a German general who served in the Wehrmacht of Nazi Germany.

General von Vormann was born in Neumark, West Prussia, German Empire. He joined the Prussian Army in 1914 and served in World War I and remained in the Weimar German Reichswehr. In World War II he served on the Eastern Front campaigns and in 1944 briefly commanded the 9th Army. During this brief interval, he became involved in the suppression of the Warsaw Uprising, although the main responsibility for the wanton destruction of the Polish capital and the massacre of its inhabitants laid with the SS-generals Erich von dem Bach-Zelewski and Heinz Reinefarth. On 4 May 1945, as the Allies approached during the closing days of World War II, von Vormann's last appointment was as commander of the largely non-existent "Alpenfestung" (Alpine Fortress). He was a recipient of the Knight's Cross of the Iron Cross. Vormann wrote two books documenting his war-time experiences: Der Feldzug 1939 in Polen and Tscherkassy. He died on 26 October 1959 in Berchtesgaden.

Promotions
 General der Panzertruppe (General of the Armored Corps) - 27 June 1944, with seniority date of 1 December 1943
 Generalleutnant (Lieutenant General) - 1 July 1943
 Generalmajor (Major General) - 31 January 1943, with seniority date of 1 January 1943
 Oberst (Colonel) - 1 September 1940
 Oberstleutnant (Lieutenant Colonel) - 1 August 1938
 Major (Major) - 1 November 1935, with seniority date of 1 October 1935
 Hauptmann (Captain) - 30 May 1932, with seniority date of 1 June 1930
 Oberleutnant (First Lieutenant) - 1 February 1926, with seniority date of 1 April 1925
 Leutnant (Second Lieutenant) - 29 January 1915, with seniority date of 18 January 1915
 Kadett (Cadet) - Until 3 August 1914 when became war volunteer in the Royal Prussian Army

Awards and decorations
 Wound Badge in Gold (for wounds received during World War I)
 Iron Cross (1914)
 2nd Class
 1st Class
 Knight's Cross with Swords of the Royal House Order of Hohenzollern (18 June 1915)
 Clasp to the Iron Cross
 2nd Class (20 October 1939)
 1st Class (25 June 1940)
 German Cross in Gold on 12 March 1942 as Oberst im Generalstab (in the General Staff) in the Generalkommando of the XXVIII. Armeekorps
 Knight's Cross of the Iron Cross on 22 August 1943 as Generalleutnant and commander of the 23. Panzer-Division

References

1895 births
1959 deaths
People from Nowe Miasto Lubawskie
People from West Prussia
Generals of Panzer Troops
Recipients of the Gold German Cross
Recipients of the Knight's Cross of the Iron Cross
Recipients of the clasp to the Iron Cross, 1st class
German Army generals of World War II
German Army personnel of World War I
German military writers